A'eau Peniamina Le'avai (born 1942) is a Samoan politician and matai. He served as the Speaker of the Samoan Legislative Assembly from 1988 to 1991. He is a member of the Tautua Samoa Party.

Peniamina was educated at Fiji School of Medicine and the University of London and later worked as a dentist. He was first elected to Parliament as a member of the Human Rights Protection Party in the 1985 general election. He was re-elected in 1988, and served as Speaker of the Assembly from 1988 to 1991, before losing his seat at the 1991 election.

Peniamina was banished from his village after announcing his intention to run as a candidate for the Samoan National Development Party at the 2001 election. He was elected despite this, and was the opposition's candidate for Speaker, but was defeated by 28 votes to 21.

He was re-elected again in 2006 as a candidate for the Samoan Democratic United Party (SDUP). In 2005, Peniamina was accused of racism over remarks he made about Chinese immigrants but later moderated his comments. In November 2006 he was elected deputy leader of the SDUP. Following a split in the SDUP, the party was no longer recognized, and he became an independent MP. He subsequently joined other independents in establishing the Tautua Samoa Party. In December 2007 he denied involvement in an incident in which fellow opposition MP (and former rival for the Falealupo seat) Mafasolia Papu Va'ai was shot and wounded.

Peniamina ran as a Tautua candidate at the 2011 election and was re-elected. He was subsequently elected deputy leader of the party. He was re-elected again at the 2016 election, as one of only three opposition MPs.

He retired at the 2021 election. His seat was won by his daughter, Leota Tima Leavai.

References

|-

|-

|-

1942 births
Living people
Members of the Legislative Assembly of Samoa
Speakers of the Legislative Assembly of Samoa
People from Vaisigano
Samoan chiefs
Samoan Democratic United Party politicians
Tautua Samoa Party politicians
Alumni of the University of London
Fiji School of Medicine alumni